The Milken Archive of Jewish Music is a collection of material about  the history of Jewish Music in the United States. It  contains roughly 700 recorded musical works, 800 hours of oral histories, 50,000 photographs and historical documents, an extensive collection of program notes and essays, and thousands of hours of video footage documenting recording sessions, interviews, and live performances.

History 

The Archive was founded in 1990 by businessman Lowell Milken, with the stated mission to "document, preserve, and disseminate the vast body of music that pertains to the American Jewish experience."  It was originally established as the Milken Family Archive of 20th Century American Jewish Music, with composer Michael Isaacson as its Artistic Director  In 1993,  Neil W. Levin  of the Jewish Theological Seminary became the Artistic Director and the Archive became known as the Milken Archive of American Jewish music. Between 2003 and 2006, it released a series of 50 CDs on the Naxos label, which have sold nearly 300,000 copies. In 2005, Producer David Frost was awarded the Grammy award for Producer of the Year, Classical, for five of the albums in this series.  At present, the Archive's website serves as the primary vehicle for the Archive’s music, and the access point for its other media. The material is organized into 20 thematic groups.

Media coverage

In its remembrance of Dave Brubeck after his Dec. 5, 2012 passing, PBS Newshour featured footage of the Dave Brubeck Quartet playing Take Five at a 2007 Milken Archive concert and recording session in Bryn Mawr, Pennsylvania.

Milken Archive footage of Dave Brubeck was featured in the documentary "Dave Brubeck: In His Own Sweet Way" directed by Clint Eastwood that aired on December 6, 2010 on Turner Classic Movies.

In September 2010, Milken Archive Artistic Director Neil Levin was featured on televisions stations across the United States in the documentary 18 Voices Sing Kol Nidre discussing the Kol Nidre, a declaration recited or sung in the synagogue before the beginning of the evening service on every Yom Kippur.

On May 26, 2010, the NPR program “All Things Considered” featured Milken Archive music in its broadcast about clarinetist David Krakauer, “Abraham Inc.: Klezmer with a funky hip hop beat.”

Volumes
The Milken Archive's collection is organized according to the following 20 thematic groups, known as volumes. As of May 2013, the Archive released 16 of the 20 volumes. 
 Jewish Voices in the New World: The Song of Prayer in Colonial and 19th-Century America
 A Garden Eastward: Sephardi and Near Eastern Inspiration 
 Seder T'fillot: Traditional and Contemporary Synagogue Services
 Cycle of Life in Synagogue and Home: Prayers and Celebrations Throughout the Jewish Year
 The Classical Klezmer: Rebirth of a Folk Tradition
 Echoes of Ecstasy: Hassidic Inspiration 
 Masterworks of Prayer: Art in Worship
 Sing Unto Zion! In Praise of a Jewish National Home
 The Art of Jewish Song: Yiddish and Hebrew
 Intimate Voices: Solo and Ensemble Music of Jewish Spirit
 Symphonic Visions: Orchestral Works of Jewish Spirit
 Legends of Toil and Celebration: Songs of Jewish Solidarity, Social Awareness, and Jewish Americana
 Great Songs of the American Yiddish Stage: Yiddish Theater, Vaudeville, Radio, and Film
 Golden Voices in the Golden Land: The Great Age of Cantorial Art in America
 Swing His Praises: Jazz, Blues, and Rock in the Service of God
 Heroes and Heroines: Jewish Opera
 Odes and Epics: Dramatic Music of Jewish Experience
Psalms and Canticles: Jewish Choral Art in America
Out of the Whirlwind: Musical Reflections of the Holocaust
L'dor vador: A Celebration of Children’s Voices

Composers
The Milken Archive has recorded or licensed music by the following composers:

References

External links
 Official Milken Archive website

Music archives in the United States
Jewish American culture
Jewish music
1990 establishments in the United States
Jewish archives